The Boys from Brazil is a 1978 thriller film directed by Franklin J. Schaffner. It stars Gregory Peck and Laurence Olivier, and features James Mason, Lilli Palmer, Uta Hagen, Anne Meara, Denholm Elliott, and Steve Guttenberg in supporting roles. The film is a British-American co-production and is based on the 1976 novel of the same title by Ira Levin. It was nominated for three Academy Awards.

Plot
Ezra Lieberman, an aging Nazi hunter, learns of a secret organization of Third Reich war criminals and neo-Nazis holding clandestine meetings in Paraguay. Dr. Josef Mengele, the infamous Auschwitz doctor, is part of the organization. He leads a mysterious project to assassinate ninety-four aging, low-level, male civil servants in different countries throughout the world.

Upon investigating several suspicious deaths of civil servants, Lieberman is amazed to find that the adopted sons of the dead men, now teenagers, share an uncanny resemblance, including blue eyes and black hair. It transpires that, using samples of Adolf Hitler's DNA, Mengele has sent ninety-four cloned babies to different parts of the world for adoption, in the hopes that one or more will turn out like the original Hitler and initiate a Fourth Reich. With each baby, Mengele has attempted to recreate Hitler's personality by choosing adoptive parents similar to Hitler's own abusive father and doting mother. The deaths of the fathers were engineered to mimic Hitler's childhood.

Sensing imminent discovery, Mengele's superiors terminate the project; Mengele angrily vows to continue alone. He travels to rural Pennsylvania, where one of the Hitler clones, teenager Bobby Wheelock, lives on a farm with his parents. Mengele murders the boy's father, just prior to Lieberman's arrival. The two men struggle and Lieberman is shot and badly wounded, but manages to release the vicious family Doberman Pinschers. The trained dogs corner Mengele until Bobby arrives home from school.

Mengele proudly reveals the boy's origins, but Bobby doubts the story. Finding his father murdered, Bobby instructs the dogs to kill the Nazi doctor, watching coldly as the man dies.

Later, while recovering from his injuries in hospital, Lieberman burns Mengele's list of the names and whereabouts of the other boys, declaring that the clones are innocent children who may yet grow up to be harmless. The final scene shows Bobby Wheelock's fascination with his freshly-developed photographs of Mengele's corpse.

Cast

 Gregory Peck as Dr. Josef Mengele
 Laurence Olivier as Ezra Lieberman
 James Mason as Col. Eduard Seibert
 Lilli Palmer as Esther Lieberman
 Uta Hagen as Frieda Maloney
 Steve Guttenberg as Barry Kohler
 Denholm Elliott as Sidney Beynon
 Rosemary Harris as Frau Doring
 John Dehner as Henry Wheelock
 John Rubinstein as David Bennett
 Anne Meara as Mrs Curry
 Jeremy Black as Jack Curry, Jr. / Simon Harrington / Erich Doring / Bobby Wheelock
 Bruno Ganz as Dr. Bruckner
 Walter Gotell as  Capt. Gerhardt Mundt
 David Hurst as Strasser
 Wolfgang Preiss as Lofquist
 Michael Gough as Mr Harrington
 Joachim Hansen as Fassler
 Sky du Mont as Friedrich Hessen
 Carl Duering as Maj. Ludwig Trausteiner
 Linda Hayden as Nancy
 Richard Marner as Emil Doring
 Georg Marischka as Gunther
 Günter Meisner as Farnbach
 Prunella Scales as Mrs Harrington
 Raúl Faustino Saldanha as Ismael
 Wolf Kahler as Otto Schwimmer

Production

Development
The book came out in 1976 and was a best seller. In August 1976 it was announced the Producers Group (Robert Fryer, Martin Richards, Mary Lee Johnson and James Cresson) had optioned the film rights to the novel and would make the movie in association with Lew Grade. Fyer had just made Voyage of the Damned for Grade. According to producer Martin Richards, Robert Mulligan was originally the director's position.

In May 1977, it was announced Laurence Olivier would star. By this stage Franklin Schaffner was attached to direct. Gregory Peck joined the film in July. Olivier had recently been ill and was taking as many well-paying movie jobs as he could get in order to provide for his wife and children after his death. Peck agreed to portray Mengele only because he wanted to work with Olivier. Mason initially expressed interest in playing either Mengele or Lieberman. Lilli Palmer also accepted a small role just to work with Olivier. To prepare for the roles of the European clones, Jeremy Black was sent to a speech studio in New York City by 20th Century Fox to learn how to speak with both an English and a German accent.

"The emphasis of the film is not on Nazis," said producer Fryer. "It is really about cloning, a logical extension of existing facts. And it's about the hatred that two men have for each other."

Filming 
Although the bulk of the film is set in South America, Fryer says actually filming in that continent was "logistically impossible" so the decision was made to shoot it in Lisbon, Portugal. Filming started in Portugal in October 1977, with additional filming in London, Vienna, the Kölnbrein Dam in Austria, and Lancaster, Pennsylvania. The scenes that were set in Massachusetts were shot in London.

The altercation between Lieberman and Mengele took about three or four days to film due to Olivier's ailing health at the time. Peck recalled that he and Olivier "were lying around on the floor" laughing at the absurdity of having to film such a fight scene at their advanced ages.

Extended ending
A brief end segment with Bobby Wheelock in a darkroom was restored to some versions in later years. In this alternative ending, after Lieberman burns the list in his hospital bed, the scene transitions to Bobby in a darkroom developing photographs of Lieberman and Mengele, with a piercing glare coming from his steely-blue eyes as he focuses on Mengele's jaguar claw bracelet before fading to the end credits.

Release
The film had 25 minutes cut when released in West Germany, theatrical as well as all subsequent TV, video and some DVD releases. In 1999, by Artisan Entertainment, and 2009 by Lionsgate Home Entertainment, the film was released uncut on DVD in the U.S. and uncut in Germany on its DVDs.

Lew Grade, who partly financed the film, was not happy with the final result, feeling that the ending was too gory. He says he protested but Franklin J. Schaffner, who had final cut rights, overruled him.

In 2015, Shout! Factory released the film on Blu-ray.

Reception

Critical response
On Rotten Tomatoes, the film has an approval rating of 69% based on 32 reviews, with an average rating of 6.3/10. The site's consensus states: "Its story takes some dubious turns, but a high-caliber cast and a gripping pace fashion The Boys from Brazil into an effective thriller." On Metacritic, the film has a score of 40 out of 100 based on reviews from 7 critics, indicating "mixed or average reviews.

Variety wrote "With two excellent antagonists in Gregory Peck and Lord Laurence Olivier, The Boys from Brazil presents a gripping, suspenseful drama for nearly all of its two hours — then lets go at the end and falls into a heap." Gene Siskel of the Chicago Tribune gave the film one-and-a-half out of four stars and called it "old-fashioned filmmaking at its worst," with "one of the phoniest stories you can imagine." Charles Champlin of the Los Angeles Times wrote "It is penny-dreadful stuff, sumptuously executed but still as shallow as a Saturday serial. One exasperation of The Boys From Brazil is that, even accepting the biological possibility of the premise, the script by Heywood Gould never confronts any of the interesting questions raised." Gary Arnold of The Washington Post called it "admirably crafted and surprisingly effective," and "a snazzy pop entertainment synthesis of accumulating suspense, detective work, pseudoscientific speculation and historical wish fulfillment." Pauline Kael of The New Yorker wrote "If the film wants to be taken as a cautionary fable—another one!—about the ever-present dangers of Nazism, then it should leave viewers with a sense of menace that Mengele's 'boys from Brazil' constitute. Instead, we get Lieberman's fuddy-duddy humanism and vague assurances that the boys are not really dangerous. And this is supposed to be a movie." Jack Kroll of Newsweek wrote that "the thoughts aren't quite deep enough even for a thriller...Heywood Gould's reasonably suspenseful screenplay blows it by suddenly turning Lieberman into a kindly old Jewish uncle instead of a man who is willing to face the tough paradoxes of good and evil."

Some scholars have used the film's idea of controlling an individual's genetics and upbringing to illustrate the difficulties of reconciling traditional views of free will with modern neuroscience.

Accolades

Academy Awards Nominations
 Academy Award for Best Actor – Laurence Olivier
 Academy Award for Film Editing – Robert Swink
 Academy Award for Original Music Score – Jerry Goldsmith

Golden Globe Awards Nomination
 Golden Globe Award for Best Motion Picture Actor – Drama – Gregory Peck

Academy of Science Fiction, Fantasy & Horror Films Saturn Award Nominations
 Best Science Fiction Film
 Best Actor – Laurence Olivier
 Best Director – Franklin J. Schaffner
 Best Music – Jerry Goldsmith
 Best Supporting Actress – Uta Hagen
 Best Writing – Heywood Gould

Other honors

The film is recognized by American Film Institute in these lists:
 2001: AFI's 100 Years...100 Thrills – Nominated
 2003: AFI's 100 Years...100 Heroes & Villains:
 Dr. Josef Mengele – Nominated Villain

See also 
 They Saved Hitler's Brain
 River of Death
 "Anschluss '77"

References

External links

 
 
 
 
 

1978 films
1970s science fiction thriller films
American science fiction thriller films
British science fiction thriller films
Political thriller films
Films directed by Franklin J. Schaffner
Mad scientist films
Films about cloning
Films about Nazi hunters
Films about Latin American military dictatorships
Films based on works by Ira Levin
Films based on science fiction novels
Films set in Sweden
Films set in West Germany
Films set in Paraguay
Films set in Pennsylvania
ITC Entertainment films
20th Century Fox films
Films scored by Jerry Goldsmith
Films set in 1978
Films set in 1979
Films shot in Austria
Films shot in Pennsylvania
Films shot in Vienna
Films shot in Lisbon
Films shot in London
Cultural depictions of Josef Mengele
Cultural depictions of Adolf Hitler
Films about Nazi fugitives in South America
1970s English-language films
1970s American films
1970s British films